Like many other martial arts, Kodokan judo provides lists of techniques students must learn to earn rank. For a more complete list of judo techniques by technique classification, including Japanese kanji, see the article judo techniques.

Ukemi (breakfalls)

Students first learn how to fall, and must master the fall exercises before moving on to the throws lists.
 Mae ukemi, forward fall.
 Ushiro ukemi, backward fall.
 Yoko ukemi, side fall (accompanied by hard slap of tatami mat).
 Mae Mawari Ukemi, forward judo roll.

Nage-waza (throwing techniques)

The 68 throws of Kodokan judo

Dai ikkyo
(1st group)
 Deashi harai (or barai)
 Hiza guruma
 Sasae tsurikomi ashi
 Uki goshi
 Osoto gari (Major Outside Reap)
 O goshi
 Ouchi gari
 Seoi nage

Dai nikyo
(2nd group)
 Kosoto gari
 Kouchi gari
 Koshi guruma
 Tsurikomi goshi
 Okuriashi harai
 Tai otoshi
 Harai goshi
 Uchi mata

Dai sankyo
(3rd group)
 Kosoto gake
 Tsuri goshi
 Yoko otoshi
 Ashi guruma
 Hane goshi
 Harai tsurikomi ashi
 Tomoe nage
 Kata guruma

Dai yonkyo
(4th group)
 Sumi gaeshi	
 Tani otoshi
 Hane makikomi	
 Sukui nage
 Utsuri goshi
 O guruma
 Soto makikomi
 Uki otoshi

Dai gokyo
(5th group)
 Osoto guruma
 Uki waza
 Yoko wakare
 Yoko guruma
 Ushiro goshi
 Ura nage
 Sumi otoshi (隅落)
 Yoko gake

Habukareta waza
(preserved techniques from 1895 gokyo)
 Obi otoshi
 Seoi otoshi
 Yama arashi
 Osoto otoshi
 Daki wakare
 Hikikomi gaeshi
 Tawara gaeshi
 Uchi makikomi

Shinmeisho no waza
(newly accepted techniques in 1987, 1997 and 2017)
 Morote gari (双手刈)
 Kuchiki taoshi (朽木倒)
 
 Uchi mata sukashi	
 Tsubame gaeshi	
 Kouchi gaeshi
 Ouchi gaeshi
 Osoto gaeshi
 Harai goshi gaeshi	
 Uchi mata gaeshi
 Hane goshi gaeshi
 Kani basami
 Osoto makikomi	
 Kawazu gake
 Harai makikomi	
 Uchi mata makikomi
 Sode tsurikomi goshi	
 Ippon seoi nage
 Obi tori gaeshi
 Kouchi makikomi
 Daki age was excluded as a Kodokan officially recognized technique.

Katame-waza (grappling techniques)
The 33 official grappling techniques of Kodokan judo

Osaekomi-waza
(pins / mat holds)
 Kesa-gatame (崩袈裟固)
 Kata-gatame (肩固)
 Kami-shiho-gatame (上四方固)
 Kuzure-kami-shiho-gatame (崩上四方固)
 Yoko-shiho-gatame (横四方固)
 Tate-shiho-gatame (縦四方固)
 Kuzure-kesa-gatame (袈裟固)
 Uki-gatame (浮固)(Added 2017)
 Ura-gatame (裏固)(Added 2017)
 Ushiro-kesa-gatame (後袈裟固)(Added 2017)

Shime-waza
(chokes or strangles)
 Nami-juji-jime (並十字絞)
 Gyaku-juji-jime (逆十字絞)
 Kata-juji-jime (片十字絞)
 Hadaka-jime (裸絞)
 Okuri-eri-jime (送襟絞)
 Kata-ha-jime (片羽絞)
 Do-jime (胴絞)
 Sode-guruma-jime (袖車絞)
 Kata-te-jime (片手絞)
 Ryo-te-jime (両手絞)
 Tsukkomi-jime (突込絞)
 Sankaku-jime (三角絞)

Kansetsu-waza
(joint locks)	
 Ude-garami (腕緘) 
 Ude-hishigi-juji-gatame (腕挫十字固) "Arm Breaking Cross Lock"
 Ude-hishigi-ude-gatame (腕挫腕固) "Arm Breaking Arm Lock"
 Ude-hishigi-hiza-gatame (腕挫膝固) "Arm Breaking Knee Lock"
 Ude-hishigi-waki-gatame (腕挫腋固) "Arm Breaking Underarm Lock"
 Ude-hishigi-hara-gatame (腕挫腹固) "Arm Breaking Belly Lock"
 Ashi-garami (足緘)
 Ude-hishigi-ashi-gatame (腕挫脚固)
 Ude-hishigi-te-gatame (腕挫手固)
 Ude-hishigi-sankaku-gatame (腕挫三角固)

Kinshi-waza (forbidden techniques)
These are techniques that have been removed from competition, mostly because of their high risk of injury.
Ashi-garami (足緘)
Do-jime (胴絞)
Kani-basami (蟹挟)
Kawazu-gake (河津掛)

See also 
 List of judo techniques

References

External links
 Judoinfo site
 JudoVideo—Reference for the Kodokan judo techniques

Lists of judo techniques